Ilya (Il'ya, or Ilja; , ,) is a village in Belarus, near Minsk, first mentioned in historical records dating from the late 15th century. Between the end of World War I and 1939, it was part of Poland. It was a significant Jewish shtetl until 1942, when nearly all of its Jewish citizens were murdered in the town square.

History

The first record of Ilya was in 1473, where it is mentioned as belonging to Bogdan Sakovich, governor of Braslaw for the Grand Duchy of Lithuania. In 1564, Ilya is first mentioned as a town. According to the 1650 inventory, the location included a market square and three streets, 93 yards and 10 public houses. There was also a newly built church, as the previous church burned down shortly before the inventory.

According to the 1882 Geographical Dictionary of the Kingdom of Poland, the town began as a manor of a Radziwiłł prince, and as early as 1634,  there was both a Christian church and Jewish synagogue. According to folklore, the prince named his manor and a nearby rivulet "Ilya" after a dream in which the prophet Elijah (Ilya) came to him.

By the 19th century, there was also a yeshiva in Ilya. There is a prominent Catholic church in the village, Church of the Sacred Heart of Jesus, designed by August Klein completed in 1909. The church survived as a dairy during the Soviet era, but was restored in 1993.

Citizens of the town participated in the January Uprising, rebelling against the Russian Empire. A monument was erected to honor the participants in the 1920s.

Holocaust

By the 20th century, Ilya had a strong Jewish community. After the Soviet invasion of Poland in World War II, the area was annexed to the Soviet Union. The area fell to the German after Operation Barbarossa, and the Jews of Ilya were forced into a ghetto. On 17 March 1942, 750 to 900 Jews were murdered by Nazi soldiers. The village was burned to the ground in 1944, just before the area was liberated.

This episode of Ilya's history was featured in the American adaptation of the TV series Who Do You Think You Are? in 2010. American actress Lisa Kudrow (best known for her role as Phoebe Buffay on the sitcom Friends) traces her family roots to Ilya, where her paternal grandmother, Gertrude "Grunia" Farbermann, had emigrated from. Her paternal great-grandmother (Grunia's mother), Mera Mordechowicz (Мера Мордехович), however, stayed, and was among the citizens murdered. In the episode, Kudrow goes to the market square, where the Jews of Ilya had been marched to a pit in the middle of the town. There, German soldiers lined them up two or three at a time at the edge of the pit and shot them, resulting in them falling into it. According to a witness statement which she reads from during the programme, oil was then poured over the stricken victims and a fire was ignited. Locals were said to have heard the screams from those who survived shooting dying in the flames for hours afterwards.

In 1962, the Association of Ilya Descendants in Israel published a Yizkor Book, The Book of Ilya, on the history of the shtetl.

References

External links

Gallery of photos
The Book of Ilya (translated into English)
Jewish Cemetery index in Ilya, Belarus

Villages in Belarus
Populated places in Minsk Region
Vileyka District
Vileysky Uyezd
Wilno Voivodeship (1926–1939)
Shtetls
Holocaust locations in Belarus